Emergency Services Day (also known as 999 Day) in the United Kingdom is an annual event on 9 September each year to promote efficiency in the UK Emergency Services, to educate the public about using the emergency services responsibly, and to promote volunteering across the emergency services in positions such as Special Constables and NHS Community Responders. Open day events are held on the nearest Sunday to 999 Day, with one main national open day rotating across the UK The inaugural Emergency Services Day took place on 9 September 2018. The 999 Day starts at 9am to represent the 9th hour of the 9th day of the 9th month.

History
The Emergency Services Day was founded by Tom Scholes-Fogg in 2016 and launched in September 2017, with the inaugural 999 Day taking place in September 2018.

Royal and political support

The 999 Day was designated as an official day in 2017 by then UK Prime Minister Theresa May. Emergency Services Day and the Emergency Services Memorial is supported by Prime Minister, Boris Johnson, the First Minister of Scotland, First Minister of Wales, the First Minister of Northern Ireland, and The Leader of the Opposition, Jeremy Corbyn.

To celebrate Emergency Services Day in 2019, the official Royal Family Twitter account tweeted photographs of The Queen meeting the different emergency services. The Prince of Wales and The Duchess of Cornwall also tweeted their support and photographs of the Royal couple meeting first responders. The Duke of Cambridge visited first responders on 999 Day.

Timeline of event
The inaugural main national 999 Day event took place on Sunday 9 September 2018 at Heaton Park, Manchester, England from 9am until 4pm.
The main national Emergency Services Day event in 2019 was held in Princes Street Gardens, Edinburgh, Scotland on Sunday 8 September 2019.
The main national Emergency Services Day event in 2020 was due to be held in Northern Ireland but this was cancelled due to the Coronavirus.
The main national Emergency Services Day event in 2021 will be held in Northern Ireland.
The main national Emergency Services Day event in 2022 will be held in Wales.

References

Observances in the United Kingdom
Annual events in the United Kingdom
Recurring events established in 2018
2018 establishments in the United Kingdom
September observances